Set the Tone is the debut album by American-British soul singer Nate James.

Track listing

Charts

Release history

References

2005 debut albums
Soul albums by English artists
Universal Music Group albums